KHMG (88.1 FM, "Harvest Family Radio") is a religious formatted radio station owned and operated by Harvest Christian Academy in Barrigada, Guam. The station signed on the air in March 1996.

External links 
 
 
 

HMG
1996 establishments in Guam
Radio stations established in 1996
Barrigada, Guam